ICCF Czech Republic is an ICCF national member federations.

Creation of SKSvCR
On January 1, 1993 the Correspondence Chess Association of the Czech Republic (SKSvCR) was founded.

Achievements
In the Sixteenth Olympiad (2010-2016) the Czech team took first place.

In the Fourth Ladies Olympiad (1992-1997) the team received gold medals.

Titled players

Grandmaster

Boukal, Petr
Chytilek, Roman
Danek, Libor
Dufek, Jiri 
Husak, Karel 
Hלbl, Jaroslav 
Jaroslav Ježek
Kratochvil, Milos 
Lounek, Jan 
Moucka, Jiri 
Nyvit, Zdenek 
Pospisil, Ludvik 
Sevecek, Rudolf 
Stalmach, Kamil 
Straka, Zdenek 
Svacek, Pavel 
Tochacek,
Vaindl, Ing. Jaroslav 
Vosahlik, Jiri 
Vrkoc, David 
Zapletal, Ing. Jindrich 
Židů, Jan

Senior International Master 
Göth, Jiří
Lexa, Václav
Makovský, Petr
Michálek, Miroslav
Miškovský, Pavel
Mráz, Milan
Mrkvička, Josef
Pletánek, Jan
Rybák, Milan
Sedláček, Oldřich
Svoboda, František
Sýkora, Josef
Teichmann, Čeněk
Trapl, Jindřich
Urban, Jaromír
Žlebčík, Ladislav

International Master 
Adamus, Karel
Alexa, Jaroslav
Buchníček, Petr
Canibal, Jaromír
Chmelík, Jiří
Ježek, Jan
Kudela, Stanislav 
Laurenc, Petr 
Němec, Jaroslav
Nun, Josef 
Šmalcl, František
Smrčka, František
Šnajdr, Josef
Spodný, Josef
Vávra, Jan
Weiner, Milan

Ladies Grandmaster 
Bažantová, Marie  
Horáčková, Vlasta 
Možná, Eva
Rývová, Anna 
Sikorová-Klosová, Alena 
Valinová, Jana 
Zpěváková, Kateřina

International Ladies Master 
Beranová, Věra
Ducháčová, Anna
Kubíková, Hana
Modrová, Hana
Nejezchlebová, Vlasta
Palková, Hana
Řechková, Miloslava
Skácelíková-Dernovská, Milena
Vaindlová, Daniela

International tournaments that are organized by the national federation

References

External links
 Sdružení korespondenčního šachu v České republice
  Short History SKS
 ICCF Gold 50th Jubilee Celebration (2002), P.Hegoburu, I.Bottlik,   

Czech Republic
Chess in the Czech Republic